Bagayevsky District is an administrative and municipal district (raion), one of the forty-three in Rostov Oblast, Russia. It is located in the southwestern central part of the oblast. Its administrative center is the rural locality (a stanitsa) of Bagayevskaya. Population: 34,813 (2010 Census);  The population of Bagayevskaya accounts for 44.4% of the district's total population.

References

Notes

Sources

Districts of Rostov Oblast